Amphlett is a surname. Notable people with the surname include:

Christina Amphlett (1959–2013), the lead singer of Australian rock band Divinyls
Edgar Amphlett (1867–1931), British fencer and journalist
Patricia Amphlett (born 1949), Australian singer whose stage name was Little Pattie
Richard Amphlett (1809–1883), English barrister and Conservative politician
Tommy Amphlett (born 1988), English-born association football player

See also
Amphilestes
Neauphlette